Praha-Čakovice railway station is a station located in Čakovice, in the northern outer suburbs of Prague, on line 070 between Prague and Turnov. It serves as a passing loop on a mainly single-tracked section of the line for lines S3 and R3 of the Esko Prague system. In 2009 the station building was refurbished.
In 2018, the place was intended as a future terminus station of Line C of Prague Metro.

References

External links
 Praha-Čakovice station statistics from Czech Railways website

Cakovice
Railway stations opened in 1872